NWFA is an initialism which could mean:
National Women's Football Association, an American football competition
  National Wood Flooring Association
North West Frontier Agency, an alternative name for the province of Pakistan known as Khyber Pakhtunkhwa
North West Film Archive, an institution in north western England
North Western Football Association, an Australian rules football league in north western Tasmania